Surendra Singh Thakur was an Indian politician. He was a Member of Parliament, representing Madhya Pradesh in the Rajya Sabha the upper house of India's Parliament representing the Indian National Congress.

References

Rajya Sabha members from Madhya Pradesh
Indian National Congress politicians
1954 births
Living people
Indian National Congress politicians from Madhya Pradesh